Robertsbridge Junction is the terminus of the Rother Valley Railway, the extension of the Kent and East Sussex Railway from Bodiam to Robertsbridge. Because the original bay platform at Robertsbridge station cannot be used as this is network rail owned property, a new station is under construction next to the old sidings (now a car park). The platform has been built and the toilets are under construction. However, the full station building is still to be built, with further structures planned.

The connection to the Network Rail (NR) mainline was re-established in March 2015 to permit stock transfers, and use of the RVR by NR plant for training and other purposes.

A small shop and visitor centre on the site is open to the public each Sunday, utilising a building that was formerly the London terminus of the Orient Express. A small collection of rolling stock is also stored here, with several items undergoing active restoration. A gala weekend in September 2013 saw a steam passenger train operating at Robertsbridge for the first time since the early 1960s.

Heritage railway stations in East Sussex
Rother District
Railway stations built for UK heritage railways